Bonipert was the first bishop of Pécs in the Kingdom of Hungary between 1009 and 1036. Similarly to all the earliest prelates in the newly baptized kingdom, he was a foreigner, most probably from Lombardy or France. He seems to have resigned from his office five years before his death.

Life

Most information on his life has been preserved in the Annales Posonienses and in a letter written by Bishop Fulbert of Chartres to him in the 1020s. Bonipert's correspondence with the Frankish prelate may reflect his French origin, but his namewhich was quite frequently mentioned in charters issued in Lombardy around 1000suggests an Italian parentage. A third source, a list of the bishops of Pécs which had by now been lost stated that Bonipert had begun his career in Hungary as royal chaplain in the court of Stephen I, the first king of Hungary.

Bonipert was appointed to the see of Pécs in 1009 when the deed of foundation of the new diocese was issued in Győr in the presence of the papal legate, Azo. Accordingly, the organization of the bishopric must have begun under his auspices. However, only the establishment of a cathedral school at Pécs is documented, since Bonipert's request for a work by Priscian from Bishop Fulbert of Chartres must have been connected to it.

The Annales Posonienses relates that Bonipert's successor, Maurus became the bishop of Pécs in 1036, but Bonipert only died in 1042. Therefore Bonipert seems to have resigned from the bishopric, most probably because of his age or health. However, neither can it be excluded that King Stephen forced him to renounce for unknown reasons.

References

Sources

11th-century Roman Catholic bishops in Hungary
Bishops of Pécs
1042 deaths
Year of birth unknown
Hungarian people of French descent
11th-century Hungarian people